Al-Salman District is a district of the Al Muthanna Governorate, Iraq. Its population in 2010 was 9,324.

References

Districts of Muthanna Governorate